This article contains information about the literary events and publications of 1802.

Events
April 15 – William and his sister Dorothy Wordsworth walk by Ullswater and see a belt of daffodils, which inspires his poem "I Wandered Lonely as a Cloud", written two years later.
April 19 – Joseph Grimaldi first presents his white-faced clown character "Joey", at Sadler's Wells Theatre in London.
Summer – Adam Oehlenschläger writes at one sitting the poem "Guldhornene", introducing Romanticism into Danish poetry.
July 31 – William Wordsworth, leaving London for Dover and Calais with Dorothy, witnesses an early morning scene he captures in a Petrarchan sonnet "Composed upon Westminster Bridge". In Calais, he will meet his 9-year-old illegitimate daughter Caroline for the first time.
October 4 – William Wordsworth marries Mary Hutchinson at Brompton, Scarborough.
October 10 – The Edinburgh Review, a reforming quarterly, is first published.
November 13 – The first play in English explicitly called a melodrama ("mélodrame") is performed in London: Thomas Holcroft's Gothic A Tale of Mystery (an unacknowledged translation of de Pixerécourt's Cœlina, ou, l'enfant du mystère), at the Theatre Royal, Covent Garden.
November 15 – Washington Irving makes a first appearance in print at the age of nineteen, with observational letters to the New York Morning Chronicle under the name Jonathan Oldstyle.
December 2–3 – Jane Austen accepts, then rejects, a proposal of marriage from Harris Bigg-Wither at his Hampshire home.
unknown dates
Henry Boyd completes the first full English translation of Dante's Divine Comedy.
Abraham Hyacinthe Anquetil-Duperron's Latin translation of Oupneck'hat is published, the first published translation of the Upanishads into a Western language.
The first part of Jippensha Ikku's picaresque novel Tōkaidōchū Hizakurige (東海道中膝栗毛, Shank's Mare) is published in Japan.

New books

Fiction
François-René de Chateaubriand – René
Elizabeth Craven – The Soldiers of Dierenstein
John Gilchrist – Hindee Story Teller
Elizabeth Gunning – The Farmer's Boy
Jane Harvey – Warkfield Castle
Rachel Hunter – The History of the Grubthorpe Family
Isabella Kelly – The Baron's Daughter
Francis Lathom – Astonishment
Mary Meeke
Independence
Midnight Weddings
Mary Pilkington – The Accusing Spirit
Anne Louise Germaine de Stael – Delphine
Jane West – The Infidel Father

Drama
Charles-Guillaume Étienne – Les Deux Mères
Heinrich Joseph von Collin – Coriolan

Poetry
Walter Scott, ed. – Minstrelsy of the Scottish Border

Non-fiction
Saul Ascher – Ideen zur natürlichen Geschichte der politischen Revolutionen (Ideas toward a Natural History of Political Revolutions)
Jeremy Bentham – Civil War and Penal Legislation
Jacob Boehme – Les Trois Principes de l'Essence Divine (translated into French by Louis Claude de Saint-Martin)
François-René de Chateaubriand – Génie du christianisme (The Genius of Christianity)
John Debrett – Debrett's Peerage (first edition)
John Home – History of the Rebellion of 1745
Malcolm Laing – History of Scotland from the Union of the Crowns to the Union of the Kingdoms
 Louis Claude de Saint-Martin – Le Ministère de l'homme-esprit
Friedrich Wilhelm Joseph Schelling – Bruno oder über das göttliche und natürliche Prinzip der Dinge (Bruno, or On the Natural and the Divine Principle of Things)
Joanna Southcott – The Strange Effects of Faith; with Remarkable Prophecies (with fifth and final part)
Noah Webster – The Rights of Neutral Nations in Time of War

Births
January 9 – Catharine Parr Traill, English-Canadian memoirist and children's author (died 1899)
February 11 – Lydia Maria Child,  American abolitionist, activist, novelist, and journalist (died 1880)
February 26 – Victor Hugo, French novelist and poet (died 1885)
June 2 – Karl Lehrs, German classicist (died 1878)
June 12 – Harriet Martineau, English social theorist (died 1876)
July 10 – Robert Chambers, Scottish writer and publisher (died 1871)
July 24 – Alexandre Dumas, père, French novelist (died 1870)
July 28 – Winthrop Mackworth Praed, English poet (died 1839)
August 14 - Letitia Elizabeth Landon, English poet and novelist (died 1838)
August 25 – Nikolaus Lenau, Hungarian-born German poet (died 1850)
November 29 – Wilhelm Hauff, German poet and novelist (died 1827)
December 8 – Alexander Odoevsky, Russian poet (died 1839)
December 23 – Sara Coleridge, English poet and translator (died 1852)
December 31 – Richard Henry Horne, English poet, critic and journalist, and public official in Australia (died 1884)

Deaths
February 26 – Alexander Geddes, Scottish theologian, scholar and priest (born 1737)
April 18 – Erasmus Darwin, English poet and natural philosopher (born 1731)
June 5 – Johann Christian Gottlieb Ernesti, German classicist (born 1756)
June 20 – Sophia Burrell, English poet and dramatist (born 1753)
June 29 – Johann Jakob Engel, German teacher and writer (born 1741)
August 10 – Franz Aepinus, German natural philosopher (born 1724)
December 27 – Thomas Cadell, English bookseller and publisher (born 1742)

References

 
Years of the 19th century in literature